P. D. Thankappan Achary (born 17 June 1945) is the former Secretary General of the 14th Lok Sabha and 15th Lok Sabha and Lok Sabha Secretariat, Parliament of India. As Secretary General, he was also the ex-officio administrative head of the Secretariat of the Lok Sabha. The post of Secretary-General is of the rank of the Cabinet Secretary in the Government of India, who is the senior most civil servant to the Indian Government. As per precedence, incumbents to the post of Secretary General have either been senior officers in the Lok Sabha Secretariat or senior civil servants in the Government of India.

References 

Living people
1945 births
Secretaries General of the Lok Sabha
Indian civil servants
People from Pathanamthitta district